"No Te Veo" (I Don't See You in English), is the debut single by reggaeton group Casa de Leones, released in May 2007, by Warner Music Latina of Warner Bros. Records.

Music style
The song known for its upbeat dance-club sound and chosen instrumentation based on Calypso music, giving the song its own unique sound in the genre of reggaeton.

Chart performance
In the U.S. the song peaked at #4 on the Billboard Hot Latin Songs chart.

Chart positions

Versions/Remixes
The original version of this song only features Jowell & Randy. The "Casa de Leones" version featuring Guelo Star, J-King & Maximan is considered a remix. Another remix features Randy and Lorna, and a third with Jowell & Randy and Swizz Beatz, Pitbull, Rupee & Nina Sky. There's also one with Jowell & Randy and Lee Wilson, and another with Jowell & Randy, J-King, Guelo Star, and Rupee.

References

Spanish-language songs
2007 debut singles
Reggaeton songs
2007 songs
Warner Music Latina singles